Wilfried Sanou (born 16 March 1984) is a Burkinabé former professional footballer who played as a winger or striker.

He started his career with Planète Champion in his home country before moving to Austria where he played for Wattens and Tirol Innsbruck. Following a stint at Swiss club Sion he spent many years in Germany's Bundesliga and 2. Bundesliga with SC Freiburg and 1. FC Köln. He ended his career in Japan with Urawa Red Diamonds and Kyoto Sanga FC.

At international level, Sanou represented the Burkina Faso national team scoring four goals in 25 matches.

Career

Early career
Sanou was born in Bobo-Dioulasso.

SC Freiburg
In SC Freiburg's 2007–08 2. Bundesliga Sanou tore his cruciate ligament on matchday 8 against Erzgebirge Aue which kept him out of action for the rest of the season and limited him to six appearances. With his contract running out at the end of the season, Freiburg were unable to agree a contract extension with Sanou. In his time at the club, he scored five goals in 46 Bundesliga appearances and four goals in 51 2. Bundesliga appearances.

1. FC Köln
In May 2008, 1. FC Köln, newly promoted to the Bundesliga, announced they had agreed a two-year contract Sanou who would arrive on a free transfer.

References

External links
 
 
 

1984 births
Living people
People from Bobo-Dioulasso
Association football wingers
Burkinabé footballers
Burkina Faso international footballers
2002 African Cup of Nations players
2010 Africa Cup of Nations players
2013 Africa Cup of Nations players
Planète Champion players
WSG Tirol players
FC Tirol Innsbruck players
FC Sion players
SC Freiburg players
1. FC Köln players
Kyoto Sanga FC players
Urawa Red Diamonds players
Bundesliga players
2. Bundesliga players
J1 League players
J2 League players
Burkinabé expatriate footballers
Burkinabé expatriate sportspeople in Austria
Expatriate footballers in Austria
Burkinabé expatriate sportspeople in Switzerland
Expatriate footballers in Switzerland
Burkinabé expatriate sportspeople in Germany
Expatriate footballers in Germany
Burkinabé expatriate sportspeople in Japan
Expatriate footballers in Japan
21st-century Burkinabé people